A weir  or low head dam is a barrier across the width of a river that alters the flow characteristics of water and usually results in a change in the height of the river level. Weirs are also used to control the flow of water for outlets of lakes, ponds, and reservoirs. There are many weir designs, but commonly water flows freely over the top of the weir crest before cascading down to a lower level.

Etymology
There is no single definition as to what constitutes a weir and one English dictionary simply defines a weir as a small dam, likely originating from Middle English were, Old English wer, derivative of root of werian, meaning "to defend, dam". The German cognate is Wehr, today the often as the composite noun Stauwehr which has the same meaning as English weir.

Function

Commonly, weirs are used to prevent flooding, measure water discharge, and help render rivers more navigable by boat. In some locations, the terms dam and weir are synonymous, but normally there is a clear distinction made between the structures. Usually, a dam is designed specifically to impound water behind a wall, whilst a weir is designed to alter the river flow characteristics.

A common distinction between dams and weirs is that water flows over the top (crest) of a weir or underneath it for at least some of its length. Accordingly, the crest of an overflow spillway on a large dam may therefore be referred to as a weir. Weirs can vary in size both horizontally and vertically, with the smallest being only a few centimetres in height whilst the largest may be many metres tall and hundreds of metres long. Some common weir purposes are outlined below.

Flow measurement
Weirs allow hydrologists and engineers a simple method of measuring the volumetric flow rate in small to medium-sized streams/rivers or in industrial discharge locations. Since the geometry of the top of the weir is known and all water flows over the weir, the depth of water behind the weir can be converted to a rate of flow. However, this can only be achieved in locations where all water flows over the top of the weir crest (as opposed to around the sides or through conduits or sluices) and at locations where the water that flows over the crest is carried away from the structure. If these conditions are not met, it can make flow measurement complicated, inaccurate, or even impossible.

The discharge calculation can be summarised as

 

where
 Q is the volumetric flow rate of fluid (the discharge),
 C is the flow coefficient for the structure (on average a figure of 0.62),
 L is the width of the crest,
 H is the height of head of water over the crest,
 n varies with structure (e.g., 3/2 for horizontal weir, 5/2 for v-notch weir).

However, this calculation is a generic relationship and specific calculations are available for the many different types of weir. Flow measurement weirs must be well maintained if they are to remain accurate.

Flow over a V-notch weir
The flow over a V-notch weir (in ft3/s) is given by the Kindsvater–Shen equation:
 

where
 Q is the volumetric flow rate of fluid in ft3/s,
 g is the acceleration due to gravity in ft/s2m
 θ is the angle of the V-notch weir,
 h is the height of the fluid above the bottom of the V-notch,

Control of invasive species
As weirs are a physical barrier, they can impede the longitudinal movement of fish and other animals up and down a river. This can have a negative effect on fish species that migrate as part of their breeding cycle (e.g., salmonids), but it also can be useful as a method of preventing invasive species moving upstream. For example, weirs in the Great Lakes region have helped to prevent invasive sea lamprey from colonising farther upstream.

Watermills
Mill ponds are created by a weir that impounds water that then flows over the structure. The energy created by the change in height of the water can then be used to power waterwheels and power sawmills, grinding wheels, and other equipment.

Flood control and altering river conditions

Weirs are commonly used to control the flow rates of rivers during periods of high discharge. Sluice gates (or in some cases the height of the weir crest) can be altered to increase or decrease the volume of water flowing downstream. Weirs for this purpose are commonly found upstream of towns and villages and can either be automated or manually operated. By slowing the rate at which water moves downstream even slightly, a disproportionate effect can be had on the likelihood of flooding. On larger rivers, a weir can also alter the flow characteristics of the waterway to the point that vessels are able to navigate areas previously inaccessible due to extreme currents or eddies. Many larger weirs will have construction features that allow boats and river users to "shoot the weir" and navigate by passing up or down stream without having to exit the river. Weirs constructed for this purpose are especially common on the River Thames, and most are situated near each of the river's 45 locks.

Issues

Ecology
Because a weir impounds water behind it and alters the flow regime of the river, it can have an effect on the local ecology. Typically, the reduced river velocity upstream can lead to increased siltation (deposition of fine particles of silt and clay on the river bottom) that reduces the water oxygen content and smothers invertebrate habitat and fish spawning sites. The oxygen content typically returns to normal once water has passed over the weir crest (although it can be hyper-oxygenated), although increased river velocity can scour the river bed causing erosion and habitat loss.

Fish migration
Weirs can have a significant effect on fish migration. Any weir that exceeds either the maximum height a species can jump or creates flow conditions that cannot be bypassed (e.g., due to excessive water velocity) effectively limits the maximum point upstream that fish can migrate. In some cases this can mean that huge lengths of breeding habitat are lost, and over time this can have a significant impact on fish populations.

In many countries, it is now a legal requirement to build fish ladders into the design of a weir that ensure that fish can bypass the barriers and access upstream habitats. Unlike dams, weirs do not usually prevent downstream fish migration (as water flows over the top and allows fish to bypass the structure in that water), although they can create flow conditions that injure juvenile fish. Recent studies suggest that navigation locks have also potential to provide increased access for a range of biota, including poor swimmers.

Safety
Even though the water around weirs can often appear relatively calm, they can be extremely dangerous places to boat, swim, or wade, as the circulation patterns on the downstream side—typically called a hydraulic jump—can submerge a person indefinitely. This phenomenon is so well known to canoeists, kayakers, and others who spend time on rivers that they even have a rueful name for weirs: "drowning machines". The Ohio DNR recommends that a victim should "tuck the chin down, draw the knees up to the chest with arms wrapped around them. Hopefully, conditions will be such that the current will push the victim along the bed of the river until swept beyond the boil line and released by the hydraulic." The Pennsylvania State Police also recommends to victims, "curl up, dive to the bottom, and swim or crawl downstream". As the hydraulic jump entrains air, the buoyancy of the water between the dam and boil line will be reduced by upward of 30%, and if a victim is unable to float, escape at the base of the dam may be the only option for survival.

Common types
There are many different types of weirs and they can vary from a simple stone structure that is barely noticeable, to elaborate and very large structures that require extensive management and maintenance.

Broad-crested
A broad-crested weir is a flat-crested structure, where the water passes over a crest that covers much or all of the channel width. This is one of the most common types of weir found worldwide.

Compound
A compound weir is any weir that comprises several different designs into one structure. They are commonly seen in locations where a river has multiple users who may need to bypass the structure. A common design would be one where a weir is broad-crested for much of its length, but has a section where the weir stops or is 'open' so that small boats and fish can traverse the structure.

V-notch
A notch weir is any weir where the physical barrier is significantly higher than the water level except for a specific notch (often V-shaped) cut into the panel. At times of normal flow all the water must pass through the notch, simplifying flow volume calculations, and at times of flood the water level can rise and submerge the weir without any alterations made to the structure.

Polynomial
A polynomial weir is a weir that has a geometry defined by a polynomial equation of any order n. In practice, most weirs are low-order polynomial weirs. The standard rectangular weir is, for example, a polynomial weir of order zero. The triangular (V-notch) and trapezoidal weirs are of order one. High-order polynomial weirs are providing wider range of Head-Discharge relationships, and hence better control of the flow at outlets of lakes, ponds, and reservoirs.

See also
 Crump weir
 Drop structure
 Fishing weir
 Fixed-crest dam
 International Control Dam

References

Citations

Works cited

Further reading 

 
 
 
 
 McKay, G.R. (1971). "Design of Minimum Energy Culverts." Research Report, Dept of Civil Eng., Univ. of Queensland, Brisbane, Australia, 29 pages & 7 plates.

External links

 Hydraulics of Minimum Energy Loss (MEL) culverts and bridge waterways (Click "proceed" at the UQ-ITS Advisory webapge)

 
Dams by type
Rivers
Hydraulic engineering